Shurabeh-ye Vosta Shahmorad (also Romanized as Shūrābeh-ye Vosţá Shāhmorād; also known as Shūrābeh) is a village in Kunani Rural District, Kunani District, Kuhdasht County, Lorestan Province, Iran. At the 2006 census, its population was 76, in 16 families.

References 

Towns and villages in Kuhdasht County